Club Deportivo Badajoz is a Spanish football team based in Badajoz, in the autonomous community of Extremadura. Founded in 1905 and refounded in 2012, it currently plays in Primera División RFEF – Group 1, and holds home games at Estadio Nuevo Vivero, with a 15,198-seat capacity.

History
Founded after the merger of two clubs, named Racing and Sport, Badajoz became a serious member of the Spanish League in 1931, when Francisco Fernandes Marquesta donated the team their first ground, named El Vivero. Subsequently playing most of their history between the third and second divisions, the club achieved a consistent stay in the latter level during the 1990s.

Never quite good enough to reach La Liga, 11 seasons in the second division came to an end in 2003, with relegation to Segunda División B, the new third level created in 1977. In 2006, Badajoz was saved from folding by the president of a junior club from the city, AD Cerro de Reyes, who replaced them in the third level, with Badajoz falling to the fourth.

On 1 July 2012 Badajoz was relegated to division four, due to a €70,000 debt contracted with its players during the 2011–12 season. being later disbanded through a liquidation process.

After the dissolution, the club was refounded by the supporters with the name of Club Deportivo Badajoz 1905. This re-foundation achieved two consecutive promotions, immediately to Tercera División and, at its third attempt, the club finally came back to Segunda División B on 25 June 2017 by beating CD Calahorra in the last round of the promotion play-offs. In 2019–20, the team dispatched SD Amorebieta, UD Las Palmas and La Liga club SD Eibar to make the last 16 of the Copa del Rey for only the second time, before losing 3–2 to Granada CF after extra time.

In 2020–21, the final season of Segunda B, Badajoz topped both of their groups to qualify for the new Primera División RFEF, but lost by one goal to Amorebieta for a place in the second tier in the play-off final.

Stadium
CD Badajoz plays at Estadio Nuevo Vivero, which had a capacity of 15,200, expandable to 30,000. The club previously played at Estadio El Vivero in the east of the city, before moving a few kilometres south of the Guadiana in 1998 to the new facilities; the first match at the new grounds took place on 2 December 1998, in a friendly goalless match with neighbours CF Extremadura.

The stadium hosted two full internationals for the national team. On 8 September 1999 Spain beat Cyprus 8–0 in an UEFA Euro 2000 qualifier; nearly seven years later, on 2 September 2006, the national side defeated Liechtenstein 4–0 in the qualifying stages of Euro 2008.

Season to season

20 seasons in Segunda División
18 seasons in Segunda División B
32 seasons in Tercera División (26 as third tier, 6 as fourth tier)

Team re-founded

2 seasons in Primera División RFEF
4 seasons in Segunda División B
3 seasons in Tercera División

Current squad
.

Reserve team

Out on loan

Achievements
Promotion to Second Division: 1952–53, 1992–93
Promotion to Second Division B: 1986–87, 1991–92, 2009–10, 2016–17
Copa Federación de España (Extremadura tournament): 2015–16, 2016–17

Historical results
Badajoz-Cartagena FC (5–1; 28 June 1992)
Badajoz-UE Figueres (7–1; 14 February 1993)
CD Leganés-Badajoz (2–6, 31 October 1993)
Badajoz-Burgos CF (5–1; 21 November 1993)
FC Barcelona B-Badajoz (1–5; 20 April 1996)
Badajoz-Elche CF (5–0; 14 September 1997)
Badajoz-Sevilla FC (2–0; 22 February 1998)
Córdoba CF-Badajoz (0–4; 22 April 2000)
Mérida UD-Badajoz (0–5; 13 December 2009)

Notable players
The following players have either appeared in at least 100 professional games with the club and/or gained international status:

 Dãnut Voicilã
 Héctor Bracamonte
 Ezequiel Castillo
 Alejandro Mancuso
 Martín Romagnoli
 Sipo
 Ivica Barbarić
 Carlos Torres
 Pablo Zegarra
 Adelardo
 Adolfo Baines
 Óscar de Paula
 Eloy
 Emilio López
 Enrique Galán
 Gerardo
 Paco Herrera
 Xavi Moro
 Pedro Munitis
 Txutxi
 Francisco Villarroya
 Valeri Broshin
 Gennadiy Perepadenko

Famous coaches
  Carlos Alhinho
 Colin Addison
 Marco Antonio Boronat
 Paco Herrera
 Josu Ortuondo
 Miguel Ángel Lotina
 Antonio Maceda
 Adolfo Muñoz
 Joaquín Peiró
 Manuel Sarabia
 Víctor Torres Mestre
 Patxi Salinas
 Pedro Munitis

References

External links
 
Old CD Badajoz BDFutbol profile
New CD Badajoz BDFutbol profile

 
Football clubs in Extremadura
Defunct football clubs in Extremadura
Association football clubs established in 1936
Association football clubs established in 2012
Association football clubs disestablished in 2012
1936 establishments in Spain
2012 establishments in Spain
2012 disestablishments in Spain
Segunda División clubs
Primera Federación clubs
Sport in Badajoz
Football clubs in Spain